The men's 49er competition at the 2018 Asian Games was held from 24 to 31 August 2018.

Schedule
All times are Western Indonesia Time (UTC+07:00)

Results
Legend
DNC — Did not come to the starting area
DNF — Did not finish
DSQ — Disqualification
OCS — On course side
RDG — Redress given
RET — Retired

References

External links
Official website

Men's 49er